Cruoriopsis is a genus of red algae. It has sometimes been considered a synonym of Cruoriella Crouan & Crouan or part of the large genus Peyssonnelia. A 2007 dissertation by Krayesky recognizes this genus, as does ITIS.

References

Red algae genera
Peyssonneliales